Avec un grand A is a French-Canadian drama television series comprising 52 episodes which aired from February 19, 1986 to March 22, 1996 on Télé-Québec. Created and written by Janette Bertrand, the series dealt with issues impacting romance and/or relationships, with each episode tackling a different subject and featuring different characters and situations. Some notable subjects included being closeted and married, prostitution, illness, rape, domestic violence and suicide.

Although not its official title, the series is sometimes referred to as L'amour avec un grand A (Love With a Capital "L") due to the fact that the series' DVD set released in 2005, featuring ten episodes, had that title on the box. It is also the title of the series' theme song, sung by Ginette Reno.

References

External links

1986 Canadian television series debuts
1996 Canadian television series endings
1980s Canadian drama television series
1990s Canadian drama television series
Television shows set in Montreal
Television shows filmed in Montreal
Télé-Québec original programming